Teboho Mokoena (born 24 January 1997) is a South African professional soccer player who plays as a midfielder for Premier Soccer League side Mamelodi Sundowns and the South Africa national team. He joined Mamelodi Sundowns on 27 January 2022 during the January transfer window.

Club career
During his schooling, Mokoena was discovered by Charles Molefe, a teacher doubling up as a soccer coach at Bodikela Junior Secondary School. His performances at school level earned him a sport at the Harmony Sports Academy from where he was picked up by SuperSport United. At SuperSport United, he progressed through the academy and later captained the club at U-19 level. He was promoted to the first-team in 2016 by Stuart Baxter and made his professional debut in February the following year, coming on as a late substitute for Cole Alexander in a 5–2 league win over Golden Arrows. In March 2017, after having become a regular feature in SuperSport United's midfield alongside Dean Furman and Reneilwe Letsholonyane, Mokoena was at the centre of a club-versus-country row when Baxter refused to release him for international duty for the 2017 FIFA U-20 World Cup due his commitment to the club's impending Nedbank Cup semi-final match. A compromise was ultimately reached between the two parties, which resulted in Mokoena being specially flown up to join his international teammates after SuperSport United confirmed their progression in the tournament. He returned in time for the final but was an unused substitute as the club beat Orlando Pirates 4–1 to claim the title. Before the final, he had also scored his first professional goal in a 2–2 CAF Confederations Cup draw with TP Mazembe.

The following season, Mokoena continued to feature regularly for SuperSport United. He managed two goals and two assists for the season, and, despite the club finishing a disappointing eighth in the league, he was nominated for the PSL Young Player of the Season award. On 13 March 2019, he was awarded the league's Goal of the Month award for January following his strike against Bloemfontein Celtic.

International career
In July 2017, Mokoena received his first call-up to the senior national team by former SuperSport United manager Stuart Baxter, who had departed the club at the end of the 2016–17 domestic season, for the nation's 2018 African Nations Championship qualifiers. He made his debut on 15 July against Botswana and was praised following the match for his ability to "carry the team on his shoulders". The following year, he scored his first international goal in South Africa's 2019 Africa Cup of Nations qualification win over Seychelles. His goal also contributed towards the nation recording its largest ever victory with the match ending 6–0 in favour of South Africa.

Career statistics

Club

1 Includes Nedbank Cup matches. 
2 Includes Telkom Knockout matches. 
3 Includes CAF Confederations Cup matches. 
4 Includes MTN 8 matches.

International

Scores and results list South Africa's goal tally first, score column indicates score after each Mokoena goal.

Honours

Club
SuperSport United
 Nedbank Cup: 2017
 MTN 8: 2019

References

1997 births
Living people
South African soccer players
Association football midfielders
Mamelodi Sundowns F.C. players
South African Premier Division players
South Africa international soccer players
2019 Africa U-23 Cup of Nations players
Footballers at the 2020 Summer Olympics
Olympic soccer players of South Africa
People from Bethlehem, Free State
Soccer players from the Free State (province)